South Louisville is a neighborhood two miles south of downtown Louisville, Kentucky, US. "South Louisville" or "South Side" is also used to describe the entire area of Southern Louisville. The neighborhood itself is bounded by Industry Road, the CSX railroad tracks, Central Avenue, Taylor Boulevard, Longfield Avenue, Compton Street, Thornberry Avenue, Colorado Avenue, Euclid Avenue, and Lincoln avenue. The world-famous Churchill Downs horse racing track and Kentucky Derby Museum are located in South Louisville.

The area was originally owned by the Churchill family and was developed as streetcar lines extended southward to the area in the 1870s. The population grew greatly in the 1890s as many factories were constructed along several rail lines in the area, including the Kentucky Wagon Company. The area flourished and even incorporated as a city in 1886. The city of Louisville fought to annex the area, and did so after a three-year lawsuit, in 1898.

As factories in the area closed in the 1970s, the area greatly declined as middle class residents left, leaving behind only low-income residents and abandoned factories. The area began to see new development as the University of Louisville began to expand its campus southward, with a new football stadium completed in 1998, a baseball stadium completed in 2005, and a soccer stadium completed in 2014, all built on former brownfield sites. A shopping center was built in 2004. Several of the abandoned factory buildings are slated to be converted into condominiums in the next few years. In 1937 there was a destructive flood.

South Louisville is increasingly becoming an immigrant centered neighborhood, with a large Hispanic and Arab populations. Since 2006, a Mosque and several Middle Eastern food stores have opened in the area.
As of 2000, the population of South Louisville was 4,688.

References

External links
Street map of South Louisville
   Images of South Louisville (Louisville, Ky.) in the University of Louisville Libraries Digital Collections

Neighborhoods in Louisville, Kentucky
Former municipalities in Kentucky
1870 establishments in Kentucky
Populated places established in 1870